Farnsworth is a surname which may refer to:

People
 Alice Hall Farnsworth (1893–1960), American astronomer
 Bill Farnsworth (1887–1966), Australian rugby league footballer, brother of Viv
 Charles S. Farnsworth (1862–1955), American general in World War I, Chief of Infantry
 Christopher Farnsworth (born 1971), American novelist and screenwriter
 Daniel D. T. Farnsworth (1819–1892), American politician, briefly second Governor of West Virginia
 Dave Farnsworth (born 1951), American politician
 David Farnsworth, American Loyalist and British agent during the American Revolutionary War, hanged for attempting to undermine the American economy by counterfeiting money
 Dr. Dean Farnsworth, developer of the Farnsworth Lantern Test, used to screen for color blindness
 E. Allan Farnsworth (1928–2005), American legal scholar
 E. L. Farnsworth (1863–1940), American politician
 Eddie Farnsworth, American politician who first assumed office in 2001
 Edward Farnsworth (1880–1937), American college football player and US Army officer
 Elizabeth Farnsworth (born 1943), correspondent and former substitute anchor of the PBS NewsHour with Jim Lehrer
 Elon Farnsworth (Michigan Attorney General) (1799–1877), American lawyer, politician and Michigan Attorney General
 Elon J. Farnsworth (1837–1863), Union cavalry general in the American Civil War
 Emma Justine Farnsworth (1860–1952), American photographer
 Henry Weston Farnsworth (1890–1915), American soldier, writer, and journalist
 Herbert E. Farnsworth (1834–1908), American Civil War soldier awarded the Medal of Honor
 Jeff Farnsworth (born 1975), Major League Baseball pitcher in 2002
 Joe Farnsworth (born 1968), American jazz drummer
 John F. Farnsworth (1820–1897), American politician and Union Army general in the Civil War
 John Semer Farnsworth (1893–1952), former US Navy officer convicted of spying for Japan from 1932 to 1934
 Kyle Farnsworth (born 1976), American former Major League Baseball pitcher
 Paul R. Farnsworth (1899–1978), American music psychologist
 Philo Farnsworth (1906–1971), American inventor of the electronic television camera
 Philo Judson Farnsworth (1832–1909), American physician and professor
 Robert M. Farnsworth (born 1929), Professor Emeritus of English at the University of Missouri and author
 Richard Farnsworth (1920–2000), American actor
 Richard Farnsworth (politician), member of the Maine House of Representatives (1996–1998, 2012–2020)
 Richard Farnsworth (Quaker) (fl. second half of 17th century), one of the early leaders of the Society of Friends (Quakers)
 Terry Farnsworth (born 1942), Canadian Olympic judoka
 Thomas J. Farnsworth, President of the West Virginia Senate from 1883 to 1885
 Viv Farnsworth (1889–1953), Australian rugby league footballer, brother of Bill
 Walter K. Farnsworth (1870–1929), American attorney and politician, Lieutenant Governor of Vermont
 Ward Farnsworth (born 1967), American law professor and dean of the University of Texas School of Law
 Wilton S. Farnsworth (1885–1945), American sports writer, editor and boxing promoter

Fictional characters
 Astrid Farnsworth, a special agent in the television series Fringe
 Cubert Farnsworth, Hubert J. Farnsworth's 12-year-old clone (also from the television series Futurama)
 Hubert J. Farnsworth, a main character in the television series Futurama, named after Philo Farnsworth
 Jerry Farnsworth and his family, characters in Robert A. Heinlein's novel Job: A Comedy of Justice
 Leo Farnsworth is one of the characters played by Warren Beatty in the 1978 movie Heaven Can Wait
 Oliver V. Farnsworth, an attorney from The Man Who Fell to Earth
 Rudolph Farnsworth, a Kim Possible villain

See also
Farnworth (surname)